The 2016–17 Nemzeti Bajnokság II was Hungary's second-level football competition. The season was won by Puskás Akadémia FC, while Balmazújvárosi FC finished second by beating Kisvárda FC on the last day of the match day by 1–0 on 4 June 2017.

Teams
At the end of 2015-16 season, Gyirmót and Mezőkövesd promoted to Nemzeti Bajnokság I.

Three teams were relegated to Nemzeti Bajnokság III : Szigetszentmiklós, Dunaújváros and Ajka.

The winners of the three 2015–16 Nemzeti Bajnokság III series were promoted to NB II: Nyíregyháza, Kozármisleny and Mosonmagyaróvár.

Stadium and locations

Following is the list of clubs competing in 2015–16 Nemzeti Bajnokság II, with their location, stadium and stadium capacity.

Personnel and kits
Following is the list of clubs competing in 2016–17 Nemzeti Bajnokság II, with their manager, captain, kit manufacturer and shirt sponsor.

League table

Season statistics

Top goalscorers

Updated to games played on 5 June 2017

Number of teams by counties

See also
 2016–17 Magyar Kupa
 2017 Magyar Kupa Final
 2016–17 Nemzeti Bajnokság I
 2016–17 Nemzeti Bajnokság III

References

External links
  
  

Nemzeti Bajnokság II seasons
2016–17 in Hungarian football
Hun